Arvi Samuli Kontu (1 September 1883 – 31 January 1945) was a Finnish agronomist and politician. He was a member of the Parliament of Finland from 1919 to 1922, representing the National Progressive Party. He was born in Kalanti.

References

1883 births
1945 deaths
People from Uusikaupunki
People from Turku and Pori Province (Grand Duchy of Finland)
National Progressive Party (Finland) politicians
Members of the Parliament of Finland (1919–22)